Lalabad (also Romanized as Lālābād; also known as Lālehābād) is a village in Gowhar Kuh Rural District, Nukabad District, Khash County, Sistan and Baluchestan Province, Iran. At the 2006 census, its population was 190, in 34 families.

References 

Populated places in Khash County